The Commitments may refer to:

 The Commitments (novel), a 1987 novel by Roddy Doyle
 The Commitments (film), a 1991 film adaptation of the book
 The Commitments (musical), 2013 stage musical adaptation of the book

See also
 The Stars from the Commitments, tribute band from the film